Lake Seit, also spelled Siit or Siet, is a volcanic lake on the island of Jolo in the Philippines.

References 

Seit